This is a complete list of operas by the Italian Baroque composer Francesco Gasparini (1661–1727).

There are 62 operas listed.

List

References

Saunders, Harris S (1992), 'Gasparini, Francesco' in The New Grove Dictionary of Opera, ed. Stanley Sadie (London) 
Oper One page, retrieved 7 April 2011

 
Lists of operas by composer
Lists of compositions by composer